Nafanua II (04) was a  built in Australia for Samoa. It replaced the original , supplied to Samoa three decades earlier.  Her crew were drawn from the Samoan Police Force.

Design
Australia designed the vessels to use commercial off the shelf components, rather than cutting edge military grade components, to make it easier to maintain the vessels in small, isolated shipyards. They are able to launch and retrieve a pursuit boat from a stern launching ramp without requiring bringing the vessel to a halt.  

On 2 April 2019, Police Commissioner Fuiavailili Egon Keil hinted that keeping her crew safe might require installing a deck gun.  Australia designed the vessels to be capable of mounting secondary machine guns, and a primary weapon of up to 30 millimeters (1.18 inches) in caliber.  Australia delivered the vessels complete, except for armament, and the original Nafanua and her sister ships were armed only with small arms.

Nafanua II was the first Samoan patrol vessel with a mixed gender crew.

Operational history

Manufacturer Austal handed Nafanua II over to Samoan representatives at its plant in Henderson, Western Australia, on 16 August 2019. Present at the handover ceremony, representing Samoa, were Fiame Naomi Mata'afa, and Fuivaili’ili Egon Keil, Samoa's Deputy Prime Minister and Commissioner of Police. Representing Australia were Linda Reynolds and Melissa Price, Minister for Defence and Minister for Defence Industry.

Samoa agreed that Nafanua II would cooperate under the Niue Treaty Subsidiary Agreement to conduct fishery surveillance as it transited Australian waters, on its first voyage to Samoa, even though she had yet to be officially commissioned. Nafanua II arrived in Apia on 4 October 2019.

On 5 August 2021 the vessel ran aground on a reef near Salelologa wharf while transporting police officers to Savai'i to manage a protest. It was successfully salvaged on 15 September and loaded onto a barge for transport to Australia. The commander of the vessel, Superintendent Taito Sefo Hunt, was subsequently charged with five counts of misconduct. A hearing into the charges by the police disciplinary tribunal began on 4 November 2021. On 21 December 2021 the officer-in-charge of the ship at the time of the accident, Superintendent Hunt, was found guilty on three charges of negligence by a police disciplinary tribunal. On 4 January he was fined $2,000 tala and demoted from superintendent to corporal.

On 5 March 2022 the Samoa Observer reported that the vessel was "beyond economical repair".

Replacement
On 2 June 2022 Australian Foreign Minister Penny Wong announced that the Australian government would gift Samoa two replacement patrol ships. The first replacement, Nafanua III, will be delivered in November 2023.

References

2019 ships
Ships of Samoa
Guardian class patrol vessels
Ships built by Austal